David Brian Ury (born September 30, 1973) is an American actor, stand-up comedian, YouTuber, and Japanese translation specialist.

Early life and education 
Ury was born and raised in Sonoma, California. He graduated from Sonoma Valley High School, where he acted in theatre productions. He earned a bachelor's degree in linguistics at Evergreen State College in Olympia, Washington and studied abroad in Japan, where he became fluent in Japanese.

Ury is a descendant of German Jewish impressionist painter Lesser Ury.

Career 

Since studying abroad in Tokyo, Ury and has worked as a translator in film, television, and manga and currently translates and writes English adaptations for manga. Ury moved to Los Angeles in August 2001 where he began performing stand-up comedy.

Cartoonist Keith Knight, a neighbor of his, described Ury's acting career as "Spooge man" and "a cavalcade of reprobates, sleazeballs, derelicts, & weirdos."

Appearances

TV Series and Movies 

Ury has made several film and television appearances, including an episode of Tim Kring's Crossing Jordan and in Shoot 'Em Up. He also appeared in Heroes, Malcolm in the Middle, Life, Without a Trace, Breaking Bad, Better Call Saul, Zeke and Luther, and The Librarians. In March 2015, Ury was cast for Rob Zombie's slasher film 31 as Schizo-Head.

A character actor, Ury has died on screen in almost every role he has portrayed.

YouTube 

Ury also has several YouTube channels/accounts/personalities and alter-egos, which include Karaoke Steve and Ken Tanaka, the fictional adopted twin brother of David Ury. Tanaka is described as an Ashkenazi Jewish man adopted as an infant by Japanese parents Hideo and Mari Tanaka, and raised in Shimane Prefecture of Japan; he returns to Los Angeles to find his birth parents Jonathan and Linda Smith.

Filmography

Film

Television

Video games

References

External links
 
 David Ury at the ISBN Database
 Ken Tanaka at the ISBN Database

1973 births
Living people
Jewish American male actors
Male actors from California
American male film actors
American male television actors
People from Sonoma, California
21st-century American Jews
Japanese translators
American expatriates in Japan